Qular may refer to:
 Qular, Bukan (قولر - Qūlar)
 Qular, Chaldoran (قولار - Qūlār)